Caroline Elliot may refer to:

Carma Elliot (Caroline Margaret Elliot, born 1964), British diplomat
Caroline Dawson (also Caroline Elliot and Caroline McKenzie-Dawson), fictional character in BBC TV series Last Tango in Halifax